Kear is a khum (commune) of Moung Ruessei District in Battambang Province in north-western Cambodia.

Villages

 Run
 Roka Chhmoul
 Anlong Sdau
 Pou Muoy
 Pou Pir
 Kear Muoy
 Kear Pir
 Kear Bei
 Ou Kriet
 Ream Kon
 Ta Nak

References

Communes of Battambang province
Moung Ruessei District